Rauf Talyshinski (16 November 1956 – 8 May 2018) was an Azerbaijani journalist and newspaper editor. He was the chief editor of Zerkalo (since 1990) and Echo (since 2001).

Life
Talyshinski graduated from the faculty of journalism of the Moscow State University in 1978. He went on to become a degree candidate in philological sciences. Talyshinski worked for the newspapers Molodyozh Azerbaydzhana (Youth of Azerbaijan, in 1978–1981), Vyshka and Izvestiya. In 1990 he became the chief editor of Zerkalo. Talyshinski received the honorary degree of Meritorious Journalist.

References

1956 births
2018 deaths
Azerbaijani journalists
Newspaper editors
Moscow State University alumni